Bravo is a surname. Notable people with the surname include:

Alfredo Bravo (1925–2003), Argentine activist and politician
Ángel Bravo (born 1942), Venezuelan baseball player
Anna Bravo (1938–2019), Italian historian
Arturo Bravo (born 1958), Mexican racewalker
Charles Bravo (1845–1876), British lawyer and poisoning victim
Ciara Bravo (born 1997), American actress
Claudio Bravo (born 1983), Chilean footballer
Daniel Bravo (born 1963), French international footballer
Danny Bravo (born 1948), Indian-American child actor
Darren Bravo (born 1989), West Indian cricketer
Dino Bravo (1948–1993), professional wrestler
Dwayne Bravo (born 1983), West Indian cricketer
Elisa Bravo, shipwrecked in 1849 in Chile and rumoured captive
Émile Bravo (born 1964), French comics author
Fabiana Bravo (born 1969), Argentine soprano
Gabriela Bravo (born 1963), Spanish politician
Guillermina Bravo (1920–2013), Mexican ballet dancer, choreographer and ballet director
Helia Bravo Hollis (1901–2001), Mexican botanist
Iván Bravo (born 2001), Spanish footballer
Jaime Bravo (footballer) (born 1982), footballer
Janicza Bravo (born 1981), American director, producer, and screenwriter
Leonardo Bravo (general officer) (1764–1812), Mexican insurgent
Leopoldo Bravo (1919–2006), Argentine politician
Luis Bravo (disambiguation), several people
Manuel Bravo (1897–1974), Chilean footballer
Marcelo Bravo (born 1985), Argentine footballer
Mario Bravo (1882–1944), Argentine politician and writer
Martín Bravo (born 1986), Argentine footballer
Nicolás Bravo (born 1786), Mexican politician
Nino Bravo (1944–1973), Spanish singer
Omar Bravo (born 1980), Mexican footballer
Orlando Bravo (born 1970), Puerto Rican billionaire businessman
Raúl Bravo (born 1981), Spanish footballer
Rose Marie Bravo (born 1951), American businesswoman
Silvia Bravo (1945–2000), Mexican astronomer

Spanish-language surnames